The men's 10,000 metres in speed skating at the 1988 Winter Olympics took place on 21 February, at the Olympic Oval. 32 competitors from 19 nations participated in the event.

Medalists

Records
Prior to this competition, the existing world and Olympic records were as follows:

The following new Olympic and World records were set during the competition:

Results

References

Men's speed skating at the 1988 Winter Olympics